Dario Bova (born 31 March 1984) is an Italian footballer.

Biography

Early career
Born in Caserta, Campania, Bova started his career at Campania side S.S.C. Napoli. In 2003, he graduated from Primavera under–19 team and left for Serie D side Faenza. After the bankrupt of Napoli in 2004, he left for Serie C2 club Imolese. With Imolese, he was a regular starter of the team, and earned a call-up to Italy U21 B team for 2005 Mediterranean Games, and for a preparation match against Serie D Best XI. He played the match against Morocco and on the bench against Libya.

He also selected to annual Serie C Quadrangular Tournament, but for Serie C2/B U21 representative team in February 2005.

Cesena
In July 2005, he was signed by Serie B club Cesena. In although not a regular of Cesena, he also received a call-up from Italy under-21 Serie B representative team in November 2005, for a training camp and against Pro Patria's youth team (Berretti team).

In January 2007, he was loaned to Serie C1 side Grosseto. In January 2008, he was loaned to Serie C2 side South Tyrol.

Lucchese
In 2008–09 season, he left for Lucchese and won Group D champion of Serie D. In the next season he won promotion to Prima Divisione as Group A champion. Nella stagione seguente continua a rappresentare un punto di riferimento costante nella squadra rossonera che disputa un campionato dignitoso di centro-classifica.

Honours
Serie C1: 2007
Lega Pro Seconda Divisione: 2010
Serie D: 2009 (Group D)

References

External links
 Football.it Profile 
 

1984 births
People from Caserta
Footballers from Campania
Living people
Italian footballers
Association football defenders
S.S.C. Napoli players
A.C. Cesena players
F.C. Grosseto S.S.D. players
F.C. Südtirol players
S.S.D. Lucchese 1905 players
A.C. Carpi players
A.S. Melfi players
S.F. Aversa Normanna players
Lupa Roma F.C. players
S.S. Fidelis Andria 1928 players
A.S.D. Victor San Marino players
Como 1907 players
Taranto F.C. 1927 players
Serie B players
Serie C players
Serie D players
Competitors at the 2005 Mediterranean Games
Mediterranean Games competitors for Italy
Sportspeople from the Province of Caserta